Alphonse Marie Tchami Djomaha (born 14 September 1971) is a Cameroonian former professional footballer who played as a striker. At international level, he represented Cameroon at the 1994 and 1998 FIFA World Cups.

Club career
Born in Kekem, Tchami began his career in Cameroon with Unisport Bafang before moving to Danish club Vejle BK. In his short spell at Vejle he scored 8 goals in 15 games, but was unable to prevent the club being relegated. Tchami's spell at Vejle led to interest from other Danish clubs and Tchami eventually moved to Odense BK (OB). Tchami was a part of the OB team that defeated Real Madrid in the 1994–95 UEFA Cup third round by 4–3 on aggregate, earning a place in the quarter-finals.

Tchami joined Argentinian club Boca Juniors shortly after the 1994 FIFA World Cup. In total Tchami played 50 games and scored 11 goals for Boca. After three years he returned to Europe with German side Hertha BSC. Tchami spent two season with Hertha before a spell in the United Arab Emirates with Al-Wasl.

Tchami was on trial with Bolton Wanderers in July 2000 following his release, playing in friendly matches on Bolton's tour of Denmark, before signing for Dundee United in August. Tchami spent four months at the Scottish club, leaving in December after playing in four matches and failing to score. Nice was Tchami's next club, where he signed a short-term contract until the end of the season. In August 2001, Tchami left France - putting what was termed a "bad spell" behind him - and moved to Russian club Chernomorets, before moving again, this time to Shenyang Ginde in China. He signed for Lebanese club Nejmeh in September 2003 but left after less than three weeks, ending his career back in France with amateur side Épernay. His club career spanned twelve clubs in ten countries over four continents.

International career
Tchami played in 57 matches for Cameroon and was a participant at the 1994 and 1998 FIFA World Cups, in addition to the 1996 African Cup of Nations.

Personal life
Tchami is from a family of footballers. His three younger brothers also played professionally: Bertrand, former Grenoble Foot 38 and Stade de Reims player, Joël, and Hervé.

References

External links
 Official Dundee United profile

Living people
1971 births
Association football forwards
Cameroonian footballers
Cameroon international footballers
Cameroonian expatriate footballers
Unisport Bafang players
Vejle Boldklub players
Odense Boldklub players
Boca Juniors footballers
Hertha BSC players
Al-Wasl F.C. players
Dundee United F.C. players
OGC Nice players
FC Chernomorets Novorossiysk players
Changsha Ginde players
Nejmeh SC players
RC Épernay Champagne players
Danish Superliga players
Argentine Primera División players
Bundesliga players
Russian Premier League players
UAE Pro League players
Ligue 2 players
Scottish Premier League players
Lebanese Premier League players
1994 FIFA World Cup players
1998 FIFA World Cup players
1994 African Cup of Nations players
1996 African Cup of Nations players
1998 African Cup of Nations players
Expatriate men's footballers in Denmark
Expatriate footballers in Argentina
Expatriate footballers in Germany
Expatriate footballers in the United Arab Emirates
Expatriate footballers in Scotland
Expatriate footballers in France
Expatriate footballers in Russia
Expatriate footballers in China
Expatriate footballers in Lebanon
Cameroonian expatriate sportspeople in Denmark
Cameroonian expatriate sportspeople in Argentina
Cameroonian expatriate sportspeople in Germany
Cameroonian expatriate sportspeople in the United Arab Emirates
Cameroonian expatriate sportspeople in Scotland
Cameroonian expatriate sportspeople in France
Cameroonian expatriate sportspeople in Russia
Cameroonian expatriate sportspeople in China
Cameroonian expatriate sportspeople in Lebanon